Sons of Shiva is a 1985 American documentary film by ethnographic filmmaker Robert Gardner and Askos Ostor, about the worship of the God Shiva, features practices of Hindu worship and devotion, a four-day Gajan ceremony, a Sacred Thread ceremony in Bishnupur and Baul singers of Bengal. It was the first film of  "Pleasing God" trilogy of films about Hindu worship produced by Harvard's Film Study Center. It was followed by Forest of Bliss (1986) set in Benaras (Varanasi).

Film festivals & awards
 Cine Golden Eagle Award, 1985
 Second Prize, International Festival of Ethnographic Films, Nuoro, Italy, 1986
 Margaret Mead Film Festival, 1986
 Festival dei Popoli, 1986
 Metropolitan Museum of Art, 1986
 Festival of India, Washington, DC, 1986

References

External links
 
 
 Sons Of Shiva at Documentary Educational Resources

1985 films
Anthropology documentary films
American documentary films
1985 documentary films
Documentary films about Hinduism
Films shot in India
Shaivism
Documentary films about spirituality
1980s English-language films
1980s American films